Boquillas was a small settlement in Texas, located on the northern banks of the Rio Grande. It was located within Brewster County, 5 miles northeast of San Vicente, Texas.  The place existed to service the mining operations at Boquillas del Carmen, Mexico, just across the Rio Grande.

Between 1901 and 1936, María G. Sada ran "Chata's Place" the only store and restaurant in the Boquillas area at that time.

Boquillas, Texas is now in Big Bend National Park.  It is now usually known as Rio Grande Village, and consists of a ranger station and other buildings to serve visitors to the park. In 1916, over 200 Villistas raided Boquillas and nearby Glenn Springs, Texas.  At Boquillas, the Americans were able to capture one of the raider commanders, but lost two men who were taken captive by the Mexicans.

The Rio Grande border crossing to Boquillas del Carmen was closed in 2002. On January 7, 2011, the U.S. National Park Service announced plans to reopen the crossing. After multiple delays, the unmanned border station was finally opened on April 11, 2013.

Geographic points of interest
 Chisos Mountains
 Emory Peak
 Mariscal Mine
 Sierra del Carmen

Climate
The Köppen climate classification system categorizes Boquillas as a semiarid climate .

 Coordinates: 
 Elevation:

References

External links

 
 
 

Geography of Brewster County, Texas
Unincorporated communities in Texas
Big Bend National Park